The 1989 Federation Cup was the 27th edition of the most important competition between national teams in women's tennis.  The tournament was held at Ariake Tennis Forest Park in Tokyo, Japan, from 1–9 October.  The United States won the tournament without losing a rubber, defeating Spain in the final (in what was only Spain's first semifinal and second quarterfinal appearance), giving the USA their 13th title.

Qualifying round
All ties were played at Ariake Tennis Forest Park in Tokyo, Japan, on hard courts.

Winning nations advance to Main Draw, losing nations play in Consolation Qualifying round.

South Korea vs. Israel

Yugoslavia vs. Jamaica

Thailand vs. Malta

China vs. Luxembourg

Mexico vs. Chinese Taipei

Philippines vs. Ireland

Indonesia vs. Malaysia

Poland vs. Singapore

Main draw

1st Round losing teams play in Consolation Rounds

First round

Czechoslovakia vs. Belgium

Thailand vs. Hungary

Sweden vs. Japan

Finland vs. West Germany

Austria vs. Mexico

Indonesia vs. Great Britain

United States vs. Greece

Poland vs. Denmark

Australia vs. China

Italy vs. New Zealand

South Korea vs. Bulgaria

Philippines vs. Argentina

Spain vs. France

Yugoslavia vs. Netherlands

Canada vs. Brazil

Switzerland vs. Soviet Union

Second round

Czechoslovakia vs. Hungary

Japan vs. West Germany

Austria vs. Great Britain

United States vs. Denmark

Australia vs. New Zealand

Bulgaria vs. Argentina

Spain vs. Netherlands

Canada vs. Soviet Union

Quarterfinals

Czechoslovakia vs. West Germany

Austria vs. United States

Australia vs. Bulgaria

Spain vs. Soviet Union

Semifinals

Czechoslovakia vs. United States

Australia vs. Spain

Final

United States vs. Spain

Consolation

Qualifying round

Winning teams advance to Consolation Main Draw

Israel vs. Jamaica

Malta vs. Malaysia

Luxembourg vs. Chinese Taipei

Ireland vs. Singapore

Main draw

First round

Yugoslavia vs. Philippines

Brazil vs. Poland

Luxembourg vs. China

Thailand vs. Finland

Second round

Israel vs. Yugoslavia

Switzerland vs. Belgium

Indonesia vs. Brazil

Ireland vs. Sweden

Finland vs. Malta

Mexico vs. Italy

Quarterfinals

South Korea vs. Yugoslavia

Switzerland vs. Indonesia

China vs. Sweden

Finland vs. Italy

Semifinals

Yugoslavia vs. Indonesia

Sweden vs. Finland

Final

Indonesia vs. Finland

References

Billie Jean King Cups by year
Federation
Tennis tournaments in Japan
Sports competitions in Tokyo
Federation
1989 in women's tennis